A Study of the Forged Classics of the Xin Period or A Treatise on Forged Classics, also translated as An Inquiry into the Classics Forged During the Xin Period, Forged Classics of the Wang Mang Period, is a work written by Kang Youwei that discusses the authenticity of the classics of the Old Text School (古文经学). Written under the name of respecting Confucius, it was published in Guangzhou in August 1891.  In the book, he presents a comprehensive critique of the Old Text School and firmly denies the authenticity of the "Old Text".

In his A Study of the Forged Classics of the Xin Period, Kang claimed that the old text versions of the classics were all forged by Liu Xin in order to legitimize the Xin dynasty established by Wang Mang's usurpation of power.

A Study of the Forged Classics of the Xin Period rocked the scholarly world upon its publication, and the Qing government ordered the destruction of the edition several times.

References

1891 non-fiction books
Confucian texts